Kher Singh Gill was an Indian field hockey player. He was part of the India hockey team that won gold medal at the 1928 Summer Olympics.

References

Field hockey players from Punjab, India
Indian male field hockey players
Olympic field hockey players of India
Field hockey players at the 1928 Summer Olympics
Olympic gold medalists for India
Olympic medalists in field hockey
Medalists at the 1928 Summer Olympics
Year of birth missing
Year of death unknown